Aldo Pellizzoni (9 May 1914 – 2 May 1977) was an Italian rower. He competed in the men's coxless four at the 1936 Summer Olympics.

References

External links
 

1914 births
1977 deaths
Italian male rowers
Olympic rowers of Italy
Rowers at the 1936 Summer Olympics
People from Monfalcone
Sportspeople from Friuli-Venezia Giulia